St. Xavier's School is a private Catholic primary and secondary school, located in Godavari, Lalitpur District, in the Bagmati Zone of Nepal. Founded by the Society of Jesus in 1951, it is the oldest modern style educational institution of Nepal.

History
St. Xavier's is the oldest educational institution of Nepal and one of the best known. Invited by the king of Nepal Tribhuvan Shah, in 1951 the American Jesuit priest Fr. Marshall D. Moran and a group of American Jesuit priests opened a residential school in the royal country villa of Godavari. After a few years, because of the increasing number of students, the primary school was shifted to St. Xavier's School, Jawalakhel, in the south suburbs of Kathmandu. The high school remained in Godavari.

In 1969, due to ever growing demands for admission to the school, St. Xavier's, Godavari was turned into a full-fledged primary school and St. Xavier's, Jawalakhel was turned into a full-fledged high school.

It was an all-boys school until 1996, when another major decision turned St. Xavier's, Godavari into a co-educational day school, focused on educating children from the local area, that would again become a high school.

Present day
Indian and Nepalese Jesuits have taken the place of the American founders but the school is still run according to the same principles of education embodied in the Ratio studiorum of the Jesuits. Classes XI and XII are also being added as per the rule passed by the government of Nepal.

St. Xavier's Godavari is one of five schools in Nepal operated by the Jesuits. The other four are St. Xavier's School, Jawalakhel (already mentioned) located in Lalitpur, and St. Xavier's College in Maitighar, both in Kathmandu Valley, while the others are St. Xavier's School, Deonia and Moran Memorial School, Bhadrapur, both in the Jhapa District.

See also

 Christianity in Nepal
 Education in Nepal
 List of schools in Nepal
 List of schools named after Francis Xavier
 List of Jesuit schools

References

External links
 

Schools in Kathmandu
1951 establishments in Nepal
Boys' schools in Asia
Educational institutions established in 1951
Jesuit secondary schools in Nepal

Jesuit elementary and primary schools in Nepal